The 1894 ICA Track Cycling World Championships were the World Championship for track cycling. They took place in Antwerp, Belgium from 12 to 13 August 1894. Three events for amateur men were contested: sprint, stayers' race (motor-paced) and a 10 km, now classified as a scratch race.

Medal summary

Medal table

References

Track cycling
UCI Track Cycling World Championships by year
International cycle races hosted by Belgium
Sports competitions in Antwerp
1894 in track cycling
August 1894 sports events
19th century in Antwerp